Topica may refer to:

Topics (Aristotle) (Topica in Latin), a treatise  by the ancient Greek philosopher Aristotle
One of the Writings of Cicero
The Topica Edtech Group